Gordonia desulfuricans is a benzothiophene-desulphurizing bacterium from the genus Gordonia which has been isolated from soil from West Calder in Scotland.

References

Further reading

External links 
Type strain of Gordonia desulfuricans at BacDive -  the Bacterial Diversity Metadatabase

Mycobacteriales
Bacteria described in 1999